Jhutha Sach may refer to:

 Jhutha Sach (novel), a two-volume novel by Yashpal published in 1958 and 1960
 Jhutha Sach (film), a 1984 Bollywood film